Ted Elliott (born 1953) is a British voice-over artist and music presenter. He has presented music programmes on Mercia Sound, Xtra AM, Heart FM, Smooth Radio, The Arrow (radio) and Radio Caroline. He was also a continuity announcer for Central Television.

Radio and TV
Having become a mobile DJ at weekends and keen to try his hand as a radio presenter, Elliott joined cable station Radio Basildon in 1980 presenting a variety of programmes and providing voice-overs for commercials. This led to an invitation to join Chiltern Radio as Commercial Producer where he was responsible for writing and producing all local advertising. He then joined BRMB in Birmingham in a similar role, before joining Mercia Sound in Coventry in a dual role as Commercial Production Manager and Presenter. When BRMB and Mercia jointly created a new medium wave station ‘Xtra AM,’ Elliott was asked to present the night time show between 10pm and 1am as well as a specialist rock and roll show on Saturday afternoons. He also produced The Noddy Holder Show.  Spin off work included shifts as a Continuity Announcer at Central Television, and Elliott eventually left Xtra AM to take a full-time position with Central ITV. He also provided the voice-over announcements on the live Friday evening programme, Central Weekend. During this period he wrote Shapes (An Introduction To Shaped Picture Disc Singles) which was published in 1993. In 1994, Elliott joined the launch team of the regional station 100.7 Heart FM and presented the morning show between 10am and 1pm. In 2001 he joined a new rock station The Arrow which broadcast nationally on DAB digital radio and the Sky radio platform and in 2009 he joined Radio Caroline.

Voice-overs and production
Elliott's voice is heard throughout the UK, Europe and Middle East every day on a variety of radio and television commercials, documentaries and on-hold messages.  He is also in demand as a 'Voice of God', providing pre recorded or live announcements at corporate events. While continuing to write and produce countless radio campaigns for many small advertisers and large brand names, he has written commercials for, recorded and produced many notable celebrities over the years including Frankie Howerd, Kenneth Williams, Alexei Sayle, Chris Tarrant and Sean Bean. Using his experience as a music publisher, Elliot has also negotiated the licensing of many well known music tracks for TV and radio advertisers.

References

Bibliography
Shapes (An introduction to shaped picture disc singles), Whitehouse Publications,

Other sources
Heart FM -  Birmingham Evening Mail, 4 August 1994 - page 5
Carlin Music - Music Week - 27 November 1976 - Carlin Music 10th Anniversary - Chappell Music Publishers, 
Central TV - Birmingham Evening Mail, 6 September 994

External links
 Tedelliott.com

British radio personalities
Radio and television announcers
Living people
1953 births